The 5th Kansas Militia Infantry was an infantry regiment that served in the Union Army during the American Civil War.

Service
The 5th Kansas Militia Infantry was called into service on October 9, 1864. It was disbanded on October 29, 1864.

Detailed service
The unit was called into service to defend Kansas against Maj. Gen. Sterling Price's raid. The regiment saw action at Byram's Ford, Big Blue, October 22. Westport October 23. Mine Creek, Little Osage River, Marias des Cygnes, October 25. Newtonia October 28.

Commander
 Colonel Gustavus Adolphus Colton

See also
 List of Kansas Civil War Units

Bibliography
 Dyer, Frederick H. (1959). A Compendium of the War of the Rebellion. New York and London. Thomas Yoseloff, Publisher. .

Units and formations of the Union Army from Kansas
1864 establishments in Kansas
Military units and formations established in 1864
Military units and formations disestablished in 1864